Erythema gyratum repens  is a figurate erythema that is rapidly moving and usually a marker of underlying cancer, usually from the lung.

See also 
 Annular erythema of infancy
 List of cutaneous conditions
 List of cutaneous conditions associated with internal malignancy
 List of migrating cutaneous conditions

References

Further reading 

  Illustration of the condition

External links

Erythemas